Brainstorm is the second album by the American rapper Young MC, released in 1991 via Capitol Records.  After the huge success of his debut album, Stone Cold Rhymin', Young MC signed a two-album deal with Capitol Records.  Brainstorm did not perform as well as his previous album, only reaching No. 66 on the Billboard 200 and No. 61 on the Top R&B/Hip-Hop album charts. It nevertheless was certified gold by the RIAA on October 9, 1991, for sales of over 500,000 copies.

Track listing 
 "That's The Way Love Goes"- 3:49
 "Keep Your Eyes On The Prize"- 4:53
 "Do You Feel Like I Do"- 4:05
 "After School"- 5:11
 "The Right One"- 4:36
 "The Um Dee Dum Song"- 2:26
 "Album Filler"- 3:17
 "Keep It In Your Pants"- 4:57
 "Use Your Head"- 5:04
 "Listen To The Beat Of The Music"- 4:55
 "Inside My Head"- 7:05
 "Life In The Fast Lane"- 7:49
 "That's The Way Love Goes" (Broken Heart Remix)- 5:20

References 

Young MC albums
1991 albums
Capitol Records albums